Marshall "Ma" Newell (April 2, 1871 – December 24, 1897) was an American football player and coach, "beloved by all those who knew him" and nicknamed "Ma" for the guidance he gave younger athletes.
After his sudden and early death, Harvard University's Newell Boathouse was built in his memory.
He was elected to the College Football Hall of Fame in 1957.

At Harvard
Newell was the son of Samuel Newell, a prominent lawyer, and grew up on a farm near Great Barrington, Massachusetts, in the Berkshire Hills.

He enrolled at Phillips Exeter Academy in 1887 and graduated in 1890. He attended Harvard University, where he became an All-American football player for the Harvard Crimson football team.  Nicknamed "Ma" Newell, he played right tackle for the Harvard football team from 1890 to 1893. Newell stood 5 feet, 10 inches, weighed approximately 170 pounds, and played every minute of every game for Harvard from 1890 to 1893. During his four years on the team, Harvard had a record of 46–3 (including 38 shutouts) and outscored opponents 1,926 to 95. The New York World wrote the following about Newell in 1892:

Newell was selected as an All-American in all four years at Harvard—one of only three players in the history of college football to be named as an All-American in all four years of collegiate play.

Newell was known as "a deeply sensitive man, a compassionate fellow of heart and understanding in complete contrast to the ferocity with which he played the game of football."  On the field, Newell was known for "his tremendous leg-drive and steel-trap grip in tackling enemy runners." Newell was also known for his love of the outdoors and became an amateur naturalist.

He also competed on Harvard's varsity crew (rowing team) from 1891 to 1893. An 1893 newspaper article described Newell's contribution to the crew as follows:

While at Harvard, Newell was also a member of the Institute of 1770, The Dickey Club, Hasty Pudding Club and Signet.

After Harvard
After graduating from Harvard in the spring of 1894, Newell became the head football coach at Cornell University in 1894 and 1895. The captain of the 1894 team was Glenn Scobey "Pop" Warner. Newell's coaching record at Cornell was 9–8–2. When he left after a 22–0 victory over Michigan in his first year coaching at Cornell, ''The Syracuse Standard wrote:

In December 1896, Newell became an assistant division superintendent of the Boston and Albany Railroad. He was killed on Christmas Eve 1897 when an engine backed over him at Springfield, Massachusetts. He was buried in the Newell family plot in Walnut Hill.

Memorials and honors
After Newell's death, Harvard alumni donated $2,000 to construct a new boathouse on the Charles River for use by the crew and named the Newell Boathouse. The tribute was completed in 1916. In addition, Gate No. 1 at Harvard's Soldiers Field was renamed the Newell Gate. In 1928, syndicated sports writer Peg Murray recalled Newell as a "Pillar of Strength" and perhaps the greatest tackle in the history of the game:

John Heisman, the namesake of the Heisman Trophy, selected Newell as his pick for the greatest football player of all time. Newell was inducted into the College Football Hall of Fame in 1957. In 1967, he was one of the first group inducted into the Harvard Varsity Club Hall of Fame.

Head coaching record

References

External links
 
 

1871 births
1897 deaths
19th-century players of American football
American football tackles
Cornell Big Red football coaches
Tufts Jumbos football coaches
Harvard Crimson football players
Harvard Crimson rowers
All-American college football players
College Football Hall of Fame inductees
Phillips Exeter Academy alumni
Sportspeople from Clifton, New Jersey
People from Great Barrington, Massachusetts
Coaches of American football from Massachusetts
Players of American football from Massachusetts
Railway accident deaths in the United States
Sportspeople from Berkshire County, Massachusetts